"I Got You" is a song written by Teddy Gentry, Robert Byrne and Greg Fowler, and recorded by American country music group Shenandoah.  It was released in January 1991 as the third single from their album Extra Mile.  The song reached number 7 on the Billboard Hot Country Singles & Tracks chart in March 1991. It also peaked at number 4 on the Canadian RPM Country Tracks chart.

Chart performance

Year-end charts

References

1991 singles
Shenandoah (band) songs
Songs written by Robert Byrne (songwriter)
Columbia Records singles
Songs written by Teddy Gentry
Songs written by Greg Fowler
1991 songs